Let It All In is the tenth studio album by American alternative rock band Arbouretum. It was released on March 20, 2020 under Thrill Jockey.
}

Critical reception
Let It All In was met with universal acclaim reviews from critics. At Metacritic, which assigns a weighted average rating out of 100 to reviews from mainstream publications, this release received an average score of 81, based on 8 reviews.

Track listing

Charts

References

2020 albums
Thrill Jockey albums